Ryan Lindsay (born 1993) is a Canadian country music artist. He has played at major country music festivals such as the Calgary Stampede and Country Thunder in Calgary.

Lindsay's main influences include 1990s country music.

Early life 
Ryan Lindsay was raised in Wainwright, Alberta.

Lindsay began playing shows as early as 15 years of age. Lindsay took a degree in Outdoor Education in Camrose at the University of Alberta, worked as a backcountry guide and traveled extensively across the Northern Arctic  of Canada and Greenland before pursuing a career in music.

Career 
At the age of 15, Lindsay began performing as a country music artist. He began playing professionally when he was 19, fronting a bar band. Lindsay became a solo artist in 2017.

Lindsay's main influences include 1990s country music.

In 2018, Lindsay was named Rising Star by a local radio station, Country 105.The following year, he released his first independently released EP, Wild and at the 2019 Alberta Country Music Awards, Lindsay won an ACMA for Rising Star.

Lindsay released his second EP titled “The Ride” in 2020. It won album of the year at the Country Music Alberta Awards, where Lindsay also received an award for Horizon Male artist.

Community involvement 
Lindsay helped found the Spirit of the Land Foundation, which had started off at the University of Alberta at Camrose as an organization focused on community-based farm projects.

Awards and nominations

References

External links 

1993 births
Living people
Canadian country singers
Canadian country guitarists
Musicians from Alberta
People from Fort McMurray